Ryan Park is a census-designated place (CDP) in Carbon County, Wyoming, United States, that is located within the Medicine Bow–Routt National Forest. "Ryan Park" is designated as an acceptable place name by the United States Postal Service for mailing addresses and is assigned the ZIP code (82331) of Saratoga, the nearest incorporated town. The population was 38 at the 2010 census.

Geography
According to the United States Census Bureau, the CDP has a total area of 2.1 square miles (5.4 km2), all land.

See also

 List of census-designated places in Wyoming

References

External links

Census-designated places in Carbon County, Wyoming
Census-designated places in Wyoming